I Am the Great Horse is a historical fantasy novel by English writer Katherine Roberts, published in August, 2006 by The Chicken House and aimed at teens. It is about the life of Alexander the Great, told from the point of view of his horse, Bucephalus.

Plot summary
The pair meet in Pella, Macedonia, and Alexander manages to be the only rider on Bucephalus after a battle in which Bucephalas lost his left eye by an enemy pike.

Katherine Roberts acknowledges that the characters Charmia and Tydeos, both grooms in the royal stable, are fictional, as is the evil horsemaster. The names of the other horses are also fictional, though the horses themselves were real enough. Prince Ochus, King Darius's son, was given a larger part than in most records, and the ghosts that Bucephalus often sees are also fictional.

From the moment the battle-scarred horse Bucephalas allows a prince and a runaway girl to sit on his back, he is bound to them for ever. The prince is the young Alexander the Great, who he proudly carries into battle, blazing a trail to the very edge of the world in master's search for glory and adventure. The girl, Charm, is a lowly stable hand, who brushes away the ghosts Bucephalas sees and forgives his arrogant ways. But unlike Alexander, Charm has darker reasons to stay by his side. 
Through the eyes of the horse, history, mystery and adventure unfold.

References

2006 British novels
British fantasy novels
British young adult novels
Novels by Katherine Roberts
Cultural depictions of Alexander the Great
Children's historical novels
Children's novels about animals
Novels about horses
2006 children's books
The Chicken House books
Historical fantasy novels